Diandra Danielle Flores (born 12 August 1994), better known by her stage name Diandra, is a Finnish pop singer who rose to fame as the winner of the sixth season of the Finnish singing competition Idols in 2012. She is the youngest winner of Finland's Idols. Her debut album Outta My Head was released in July 2012.

Career
In Autumn 2004, when she was just 10, Diandra won Staraoke, a Finnish children singing competition. Her father is from Chile and her mother from Finland. She made a TV comeback in Idols 2012. Immediately after winning Idols, Diandra signed a recording contract with Universal Music and released her debut single "Onko Marsissa lunta?" followed by "Outta My Head". Her debut album Outta My Head was released on 5 July 2012, only two months after she won Idols. She was the second woman to win Idols after Hanna Pakarinen. She performed the English-language song "Light Up the Ice" as the theme music to the 2017 World Figure Skating Championships.

Discography

Albums

Singles

As a featured artist

References

1994 births
Living people
People from Hyvinkää
21st-century Finnish women singers
Finnish people of Chilean descent
Finnish pop singers
Idols (TV series) winners
Idols (franchise) participants